Falkenseebach is a river in Bavaria Germany. It flows northeast and then turns west to confluence with the Großwaldbach in Inzell; there the Rote Traun is formed.

Gallery

See also
List of rivers of Bavaria

References

Rivers of Bavaria
Rivers of Germany